The Georgina Range is a small mountain range in southwestern British Columbia, Canada, located on the south side of Gilford Island overlooking entrance to Knight Inlet. It has an area of 53 km2 and is a subrange of the Pacific Ranges which in turn form part of the Coast Mountains.

See also
List of mountain ranges

References

Pacific Ranges